is a simulation video game developed and published by Media Entertainment for the PlayStation. The game was re-released as a PS one Classic on December 24, 2009 on the Japanese PlayStation Network. It is a promotional tie in to the Gyu-Kaku restaurant chain, where the player must serve customers barbecue products while maintaining the customers' patience.

References 

Action video games
Puzzle video games
2001 in video gaming
Barbecue
Cooking video games
Hamster Corporation games
PlayStation (console) games
PlayStation (console)-only games
MonkeyPaw Games games